Paulică Ion (born 10 January 1983, in Brăila) is a Romanian rugby union footballer. A tighthead prop, he started his career with CSA Steaua București, before moving to Bath in 2007 and previously played for London Irish. He was loaned to London Welsh for the 2012/13 Season. On 20 April 2013, it was announced Paulica Ion would join the French Top 14 side USA Perpignan for the 2013/14 season.

Provincial / State sides 
Ion was also selected between 2005 and 2015 for the State side assembled to play in the European Cups, namely București Wolves.

International career
As of 11 October 2015, he has played 74 games for the Romanian national team, scoring one try. He played one match at the 2003 Rugby World Cup finals, two at the 2007 Rugby World Cup finals, four at the 2011 Rugby World Cup finals and also four at the 2015 Rugby World Cup finals.

References

External links

 
 
 
Profile at the London Irish site
Profile at the London Welsh site

1983 births
Living people
Sportspeople from Brăila
Romanian rugby union players
Romania international rugby union players
Rugby union props
CS Universitatea Cluj-Napoca (rugby union) players
CSA Steaua București (rugby union) players
București Wolves players
Bath Rugby players
London Irish players
London Welsh RFC players
USA Perpignan players
Romanian expatriate rugby union players
Expatriate rugby union players in England
Romanian expatriate sportspeople in England
Expatriate rugby union players in France
Romanian expatriate sportspeople in France